Daniel Laurent (born 4 February 1949) is a French politician and a member of the Senate of France. He represents the Charente-Maritime department and is a member of the Union for a Popular Movement Party.

References
Page on the Senate website

1949 births
Living people
Rally for the Republic politicians
Union for a Popular Movement politicians
Gaullism, a way forward for France
French Senators of the Fifth Republic
Senators of Charente-Maritime